Marjorie "Margie" Hendrix (sometimes Hendricks) (March 13, 1935 – July 14, 1973) was an American rhythm and blues singer and founding member of the Raelettes, who were the backing singers for Ray Charles, the father of her child, Charles Wayne Hendrix.

Early years and the Cookies
Margie Hendrix was born on March 13, 1935, in Bulloch County, Georgia to Kattie and Renzy Hendrix. She sang, played piano and directed her local church choir while in her pre-teens. In the early 1950s', she moved to New York City when she was 18 and signed a record deal with Lamp records and released her first 3 singles, which were "Everything", "Good Treatment", and "Every Time" in 1954, but they did not hit the charts and she left the label in 1955. In 1956, she replaced Beulah Robertson in the Cookies, joining existing members Dorothy Jones and Darlene McCrea. The group signed to Atlantic Records, and had a No. 9 hit single on the R&B chart called "In Paradise". They also started working as session singers at Atlantic, where they were introduced to Ray Charles. The Cookies auditioned for Charles on the song "Leave My Woman Alone". In 1958, Hendrix and McCrea left the Cookies and later formed the Raelettes as Ray's backing singers.

The Raelettes and Ray Charles 
In October 1958, Ray Charles recorded his first song with the Raelettes called "Night Time Is the Right Time", which reached No. 5 on the R&B charts. The song is widely known for Hendrix's powerful guest vocals. There was a mutual attraction and Hendrix and Charles began an affair, and had one son, Charles Wayne Hendricks (born October 1, 1959, in New York City) together. After she gave birth to Charles Wayne, she tried to convince Ray to leave his wife Della Beatrice Howard and live with her and their son, but Ray refused. Margie and the Raelettes continued to perform on several of Ray's songs, but during the early 1960's, Hendrix's relationship with Ray began to fall apart and she later started to use alcohol and heroin, and her career began to suffer. Her drug use started to affect her appearance and behavior with the Raelettes like picking fights during recording sessions, not showing up to performances, and showing up to performances drunk. In 1964 the Raelettes released the single "A Lover's Blues" which featured Hendrix on lead vocals, but this was the last song that she recorded with Ray, because in July 1964 during a tour in Europe after a heated and possibly physically violent argument, Charles officially fired Hendrix from the Raelettes and sent her back to the United States.

Unsuccessful solo career and drug addiction  

After leaving the Raelettes, in 1965 Hendrix signed a record deal with Mercury Records and she released five singles, but the singles failed to become hits and an album was shelved causing an increase in her use of alcohol and more damaging drugs. In 1966, Hendrix married jazz singer Robert Fulson, who was the brother of singer Lowell Fulson. On September 7, 1967, while driving in Texas, Hendrix was involved a car accident with Robert, when their car was struck by a lumber truck. They both survived, but Hendrix suffered neck injuries and slight loss of hearing in her right ear. She was dropped from the Mercury label in late 1967 due to her music failing. Hendrix and Fulson divorced in 1968. Hendrix later signed her second record deal with the Sound Stage 7 label in that same year and released two singles, but they also failed and she was dropped from the label in 1970. In 1971, she became mentally unstable, faded away from the public eye, quit singing, and continued to use drugs and alcohol for the remainder of her life.

Death 
Hendrix died in New York, New York, on July 14, 1973 (aged 38). The official cause of her death is unknown due to lack of evidence and that no autopsy was performed, but most sources claim her death was caused by a heroin overdose, but there are rumors that she died in a car crash or from cancer and some sources also claim that she was facing poverty around the time of her death. She is buried at New Bethlehem Missionary Baptist Church Cemetery in Register, Georgia. Her son Charles Wayne died in 2013 from unknown causes.

In popular culture
Margie was portrayed by Regina King in the 2004 film Ray. King received her first NAACP Image Award and Satellite Award for her performance.

References

External links
 Discography at discogs.com
 Margie Hendrix Memorial at www.findagrave.com

1935 births
1973 deaths
20th-century African-American women singers
20th-century American singers
20th-century American women singers
The Raelettes members
The Cookies members